Happy Birthday is a 2022 Indian Telugu-language surreal crime comedy film written and directed by Ritesh Rana, and produced by Mythri Movie Makers and Clap Entertainment. It stars Lavanya Tripathi in a dual role along with  Naresh Agastya, Vennela Kishore, and Satya.

Principal photography of the film took place between November 2021 and May 2022 in Hyderabad. The film has music composed by Kaala Bhairava. Happy Birthday was theatrically released on 8 July 2022 and received mixed reviews from critics and audiences.

Premise 
Set in a fantasy world, Union minister Rithwik Sodhi passes a new gun law in the parliament that liberalizes the manufacturing and sale of fire arms, leading to an increased gun culture in the country.

Cast

Production 
Following his debut directorial venture Mathu Vadalara (2019), Ritesh Rana was signed for another film under the production of Mythri Movie Makers. Actress Lavanya Tripathi was cast the lead in her first crime comedy film. Naresh Agastya, Satya, Vennela Kishore and Gundu Sudarshan play other roles. In the film, a union minister (Kishore) proposes a new gun law that aims to liberalize purchase, sale, manufacture and use of fire arms in the country which leads to increase in the gun culture in the country. Tripathi plays a modern girl nicknamed Happy 340.

The film began its production in Hyderabad in November 2021. In December, the film was titled as Happy Birthday. The shoot was completed by May 2022. Kaala Bhairava composed the film's music. The film has cinematography by Suresh Sarangam and editing by Karthika Srinivas.

Music
The music of the film is composed by Kaala Bhairava. Lyrics are written by Kittu Vissapragada. The first single was released on 4 July 2022.

Release 
Happy Birthday was released theatrically on 8 July 2022, advanced by a week from its initial release date of 15 July 2022.

Reception 
Neeshitha Nyayapati of The Times Of India rated the film 3 out of 5 stars and wrote "Despite its flaws, Happy Birthday is refreshing and is exactly what TFI needs to shake things up. It might be far from perfect but Ritesh deserves an A+ for effort". Arvind V of Pinkvilla rated the film 2.5 out of 5 stars and wrote "The satirical tone of the film has a touch of intelligence.The film's genre, on the other hand, looks either superfluous or half-baked".  A critic for The Hans India rated the film 2 out of 5 stars and wrote "Happy Birthday is a different attempt in the comedy genre. But, it fails to provide a cohesive narrative from the start to the end. It ends up boring and scratching our heads".

References

External links 

 

Mythri Movie Makers films
Films scored by Kaala Bhairava
Films shot in Hyderabad, India
2020s Telugu-language films
Indian crime comedy films
2020s crime comedy films
Gun violence in popular culture